James Sewall Morsell (January 10, 1775 – January 11, 1870) was a United States circuit judge of the United States Circuit Court of the District of Columbia.

Education and career

Born on January 10, 1775, in Calvert County, Province of Maryland, British America, Morsell was in private practice in Georgetown, D.C. until 1815. He served in the United States Army from 1813 to 1814, during the War of 1812.

Notable clients

Morsell represented a number of African American families who petitioned for their freedom before the United States Circuit Court of the District of Columbia.

Federal judicial service

Morsell was nominated by President James Madison on January 7, 1815, to a seat on the United States Circuit Court of the District of Columbia vacated by Judge Nicholas Battalle Fitzhugh. He was confirmed by the United States Senate on January 11, 1815, and received his commission the same day. His service terminated on March 3, 1863, due to abolition of the court.

Death

Morsell died on January 11, 1870, in Prince George's County, Maryland.

See also
List of United States federal judges by longevity of service

References

1775 births
1870 deaths
19th-century American judges
Judges of the United States Circuit Court of the District of Columbia
United States federal judges appointed by James Madison